Jigme Singye Wangchuck (born 11 November 1955) is a member of the House of Wangchuck who was the king of Bhutan (Druk Gyalpo) from 1972 until his abdication in favor of his eldest son, Jigme Khesar Namgyel Wangchuck, in 2006.

During his reign, he advocated the use of a Gross National Happiness index to measure the well-being of citizens rather than Gross domestic product.

Early life
Jigme Singye Wangchuck was born in Dechencholing Palace in Thimphu, Bhutan, on 11 November 1955. to Jigme Dorji Wangchuck and Ashi Kesang Choden Wangchuck. The political officer of India stationed in Sikkim and the representative of the Sikkimese government came soon after to offer felicitations to the royal parents and to pay their respect to the newborn prince. At the age of four, sometime in 1959, the young Crown Prince received the offerings of good wishes and respects by the public, monks, and officials for the first time in Tashichho Dzong.

Wangchuck received western and traditional learning in various institutions. He began studying at Dechencholing Palace, when he was six years old, in 1961. Soon afterwards, he went to study at St. Joseph's School, Darjeeling, in India. In 1964, he attended Heatherdown School in England where he completed his studies in 1969. The next phase of his formal education took place at Namselling Palace in 1969. Finally, he attended Ugyen Wangchuck Academy at Satsham Choten in Paro, which was established in 1970, along with a class of selected students from all over Bhutan.

Crown Prince
In 1971 Wangchuck's father appointed Wangchuck as the Chairman of National Planning Commission, charged with the planning and co-ordination of the five year development plan. The following year, on 16 June 1972, he was made the Trongsa Penlop bestowing on him directly the saffron scarf or namza. The 3rd Five-Year Plan (FYP), which spanned the period 1971–77, was in progress when his father died. Wangchuck was 16 at that time. 1972 to 1976 was the period of the 3rd FYP, and 1976 to 1981 was the period of 4th FYP. As both King and the Chairman of the National Planning Commission, the clearing house for the programmes and projects, Wangchuck guided the planned activities first in broad terms and then increasingly in detail.

Royal Wedding
In a public ceremony, the Royal Wedding of Wangchuck was held in Dechog Lhakhang in Punakha Dzong on 31 October 1988, corresponding with the Descending Day of Buddha. The four queens, Dorji Wangmo Wangchuck, Tshering Pem Wangchuck, Tshering Yangdon Wangchuck and Sangay Choden Wangchuck are daughters of Dasho Yab Ugyen Dorji, the descendant of both the mind and speech incarnations of Ngawang Namgyal, and Yum Thuiji Zam.

Previously, they had married privately in 1979.

Rural development
In his Coronation Address on 2 June 1974, Jigme Singye stressed the need "to attain self-reliance and preserve Bhutan’s sovereignty and independence." He also stressed that any development undertaking should be a genuine collaboration between the people and the government. During the 1970s, immediate aims for rural households unfolded in terms of intensive valley projects, cash crops cultivation, especially potatoes – irrigation, and resettlement. Enhancing the income and livelihood of the rural people were the main focus of the 3rd and 4th FYPs. Soon after he acceded to the throne, Jigme Singye launched the Trashigang and Tsirang Intensive Valley Development Projects in 1972. These projects were part of a larger vision of food self-sufficiency and income generation.

Encouraged by the achievements in the Trashigang and Tsirang Intensive Valley Projects, similar valley projects were replicated in Mongar and the newly created Shumar (Pemagatshel) districts. These projects were also sites of experimental and participatory decision making. By 1981, Trashigang and Tsirang had fully functional DYTs.

In higher altitude areas a new initiative by Wangchuck in early 1970s consisted of diffusing potatoes as cash crops, first tested in royal pastureland of Longtoed and Longmed, which had been converted to potato farms. Beginning with the large-scale production in Khaling and Chapcha, potatoes become a key export crop, reaching 60,000 tonnes, grown by over 10,725 households by 2006.

In southern Bhutan, the focus was on growing citrus fruits. For example, in 1977, the King encouraged the people of Dagana to start cardamom and orange plantations. Both of these cash crops are now major sources of rural income as 3,400 tonnes of cardamom, 55,558 tonnes of oranges and 7,400 tonnes of apples were produced in 2006 due to the initiatives taken first in 1970s.

Socio-economic development

A Kasho (royal decree) issued by King Jigme Singye in 1986 directed the Planning Commission to ensure that "the basis for the evaluation of the achievements of the Sixth Plan is to see whether the people enjoy happiness and comfort". The social and economic indicators point towards sub-ordinate goals, not ultimate goals which was to be measured from a holistic, GNH point of view. Happiness and contentment became the ultimate yardstick of progress.

Data, which enables comparison of achievements over time starting from 1985 onwards, some 14 years after the king's ascension to the throne.

There is a lack of systematic quantitative information about the social and economic situation of Bhutan for the 1970s. The baselines for historical comparison available today were first collected in 1985 – the year when time series data was collected. Some information that date back to 1974 indicate the low base of infrastructure that existed at that time. There were 11 ill-equipped hospitals, manned mostly by foreign doctors, and 45 basic health units in 1974, the year Jigme Singye's coronation was held.

Sparse networks of 1,332 km of roads had been built by 1974, compared to 4,544 by the end of his reign in 2006. In 1974, 24 wireless stations linked the rest of the country. Telephone connections, mostly for officials in Thimphu, were limited to 480 in 1974 compared to 31,526 in 2006.

There were 13,410 students enrolled in schools compared to 151,260 or so in 2006. By 2006, school enrollment touched 90%, literacy 60%, and both were so mainly due to a free education policy (more information at Education in Bhutan and Ministry of Education Website).

Health services, safe drinking water and better nutrition have led to a 66-year life-span and lower morbidity during this life span. One of the constraints in education and health was the lack of qualified people. In 1976, King Jigme Singye commanded the establishment of the Royal Institute of Health Sciences (RIHS) and the first batch of Health Assistants and Basic Health Workers passed out in 1986. There were 56 health establishments in 1974; by 2006 there were 715 resulting in 90% free primary health coverage. In 1985, there was nearly 50% health coverage. Infant mortality has fallen from 142 in 1985, to 60 in 2006. This was mainly due to the success of universal child immunisation and the supply of safe drinking water. There were 150 water supply schemes in 1985; this increased to 3,852 by 2006, giving 78% coverage of safe drinking water. Maternal mortality rate dropped from 7.7% in 1985 to 2.6% in 2006.

Besides these human development indicators, material prosperity rose remarkably. The distance between Bhutan and the outside world shortened because of motor road and air services. Wangchuck visited Delhi in 1978 and during that visit he discussed the possibility of having air links with India to promote its trade and commerce. The discussion was fruitful and led to a Donier flight between Paro and Kolkata in 1983. By 2006, air services connected Bhutan to Kathmandu, Delhi, Dhaka and Bangkok.

Just four million units of electricity were generated in 1974, compared to 3.357 billion units by the end of his reign in 2006. In 1985, just around 10,000 households had electricity, and the number reached over 65,000 meter-point units by 2006. The connectivity of Bhutan increased in his reign through air services, internet, and surface transport. Internet reached Bhutan in 1999. The spread of faxes, telephones, satellite TVs, computers, and the Internet brought Bhutan into a transnational or globalized world.
The national income of the country, as measured by GDP, was Nu 2.4 billion in 1985. This increased to Nu 36.9 billion in 2006, which was a 15-fold increase in 21 years. Bhutan's per capita income reached US$1,500 in 2006 by the end of his reign. In purchasing power parity terms, Bhutan's per capita income in 2006 was nearly US$4,085.

The king introduced an unconventional tourism policy of "high-value, low-volume". Soon after the Coronation, in October 1974, the first group of 20 tourists entered the country through Phuntsholing, as there was no air service then. By 2006, the number of tourists, flown in by Druk Air and who paid royalty, reached 17,344.

One of the landmark developments, soon after his coronation, was the signing of the Chukha Hydropower Project in March 1974. Construction began in 1983 and the President of India, Ramaswamy Venkataraman and King Jigme Singye inaugurated the Chukha Hydropower Project on 21 October 1988, nearly 13 years after the first discussion on it took place, in 1974. Chukha improved the revenue situation and the financial capacity of the country.
In the industrial sphere, an early landmark project planned soon after his coronation was the development of a complete master plan for the construction of the Penden Cement Factory. The actual construction started in 1979 and the company was in production by 1983. The Penden Cement Authority produced about half a million tonnes of cement every day, for instance in 2008. Manufacturing and mining spread, mostly in the southern towns.

Culture
The country strived to preserve major local languages, knowledge, beliefs, customs, skills, trades and institutions, and even species of crops and plants. Bhutanese society also remained cohesive because of promoting cultural identities under the Fourth King's reign. Wangchuck emphasized the distinctive characters of Bhutanese cultures. Wangchuck stated that it is the "distinct identity of our county", and not the nation's "wealth, weapons and armed forces", that is the vital instrument in securing the sovereignty of the nation.
In the 34 years of Wangchuck's reign, the ten traditional cultural sciences (rignas) received considerable priority. Wangchuck cherished the importance of both the intangible and tangible aspects of Bhutanese culture.

As an example of Wangchuck's support to classical Bhutanese culture he had Tango Shedra built. Tango Shedra became the apex of education according to classical system of cultural sciences, Rignas. Academic monks complete their long studies with bachelor's and master's degrees in Tango. In 2008, 163 candidates – with 14 master's degrees and 149 bachelor's degrees –from Tango Shedra and Sangngag Chokhor Shedra in Paro held their graduation ceremonies at Tango.

Zo rigpa was enhanced by Wangchuck when he opened the Kawajangsa Institution of Zorig (now known as National Institute for Zorig Chusum) in 1971. At first, this institute concentrated on traditional fine arts. A similar institution was opened in 1997 in Tashi Yangtse. The Folk Heritage Museum started by Her Majesty Ashi Dorji Wangmo Wangchuck in Kawajangsa, Thimphu in 2001, drew attention to the heritage of lay people's sustainable products and their lifestyle. Likewise, in 2001, the first Textile Museum opened by Her Majesty Ashi Sangay Choden Wangchuck drew attention to the weaving skills of Bhutan. Skilled artisans – painters, statue-makers, carpenters and masons proliferated in Wangchuck's reign not only because of these new institutions, but also by receiving on the job training in many new temples and dzongs constructed in the country.

The profile of indigenous medicine also became higher under Wangchuck's reign. Indigenous medicine spread as a parallel health service due to support to Institute of Indigenous Medicine.

There probably were only about 2,000 monks in the state supported monasteries in 1972 when his reign started. By 2006, the number of monks subsisting on state allowances had increased to little over 6,000. In parallel to the increase in the number of monks and nuns, the monastic infrastructure that included tutors, lamas, temples,  (meditation centres), and shedras (Buddhist colleges), increased in Wangchuck's reign. Many new official dratshangs in district headquarters, which hitherto did not have any monastic body, were opened such as Tsirang, Gaylegphug, Tashi Yangtse, Samtse, Pema Gatshel, Chukha, Bumthang and Zhemgang. Numerous affiliate monasteries to each dzongkhag rabdey were also opened throughout the country.

By 2006, there were 13 shedras located in Tango, Dodeydrag, Khothokha, Sanga Choekhor, Gontey, Tshangkha, Tharpaling, Nimalung, Talo Nalanda, Sewla, Ngatsang, Drametse, and Bartsham with a total enrolment of some 700 monks. There were over 24  or meditation places, stretching from Singye dzong in the east to Tagchu goenpa in Haa, enlisting 300 officially supported people who meditate on a long-term basis in 2006. These numbers were rolled as new meditation to succeed old ones upon their completion. There were over 45 monastic lobdras, where teachers received official stipends and where  (young lay priests) studied. By 2006, there were also 10 nunneries, started on an organized basis, located in Jashar goenpa in Pema Gatshel in the east to Kila Goenpa in Paro in the west.

Environmental preservation
Wangchuck also enhanced the protection of natural resources such as forests and biodiversity. Wangchuck foresaw the potentially adverse impacts of both increased economic activity and increased population on the fragility of the mountain ecosystem. He raised the importance of preservation of environment during policy discussions, which resulted in vast areas of the country being devoted to parks and sanctuaries.

Among events of his reign:
 Jigme Dorji National Park, Khaling Wildlife Sanctuary and Phibsoo Wildlife Sanctuary declared in 1974
 Environmental Studies started in schools, 1985
 Bhutan identified as a global hotspot, 1988
 National Environment Commission established in 1990
 Bhutan Trust Fund for Environment established in 1992
 Toorsa Nature Reserve, Jigme Singye Wangchuck National Park (known earlier as Jow Durshing National Park), Thrumsengla National Park, Sakteng Wildlife Sanctuary and Bomdeling Wildlife Sanctuary established in 1993
 UN Framework Convention on Climate Change and Convention on Biological Diversity signed in 1995
 Environment Assessment Act, 2000
 Bio-diversity Act of Bhutan, 2003
 Wangchuck and the people of Bhutan received the "Champions of the Earth" Award from UNEP, 2005

Decentralisation
At the end of the 4th FYP (1976-1981), Wangchuck extensively reviewed the successes and challenges of the previous four years of development, which also included the physical inspection of the field projects. Wangchuck envisioned different planning system for the 5th FYP (1981–86) emphasising decentralisation. New dzongdags were appointed in all the 18 districts, with responsibilities of managing public finances and co-ordinating district development plans, in their capacities as chairmen of DYTs. Wangchuck's strengthening of the governmental sectors went hand in hand with strengthening local bodies like Dzongkhag Yargye Tshogchung (DYT) that Wangchuck founded in 1981, and the Gewog Yargye Tshogchung (GYT) he founded in 1991. He increasingly devolved authority on them.

Wangchuck's state visits abroad
Bhutanese participation in international organisations at various levels increased. Personally, Wangchuck attended the non-aligned and SAARC summits until 1997, travelling to Colombo in 1976 for 8th Non-Aligned Summit; Havana in 1979 for 6th Non-Aligned Summit; New Delhi in 1983 for 5th SAARC Summit and 1995 for 8th SAARC Summit; Harare in 1986 for 8th Non-Aligned Summit; Kathmandu in 1987 for 3rd SAARC Summit; Islamabad in 1988 for 4th SAARC Summit; Belgrade in 1989 for 9th Non-Aligned Summit; Malé in 1990 for 5th SAARC Summit, and Dhaka in 1993 for 7th SAARC Summit.

Diplomatic expansion
Wangchuck emphasised a two-fold foreign policy for Bhutan: to deepen Bhutan's relations with India and to create new bonds of friendship with fellow members of the UN. To diversify the sources of funding, Bhutan cultivated close relationships with the UN, ever since the visit of a UN Under-Secretary General in 1974.
Relationships with other nations widened rapidly after 1974. The Coronation of 1974 brought a large numbers of foreign delegates. Representatives of some 18 nations attended the Coronation. Notably, a representative from China also attended. Bhutan had supported China's seat in the United Nations in 1971 soon after Bhutan became a member of the UN.
In parallel to the increase in development assistance, the decade between 1980 and 1990 was a period of enhanced diplomacy for Bhutan. In this decade, under the guidance of Wangchuck, Bhutan established diplomatic relations with 17 out of the existing 53 countries, and became associated with 12 out of 20 organisations of the United Nations family.

In Wangchuck's reign, diplomatic links were developed with many other nations such as Bangladesh in 1973; Kuwait in 1983; Nepal in 1983; The Maldives in 1984; Denmark in 1985; Norway in 1985; Sweden in 1985; Switzerland in 1985; Netherlands in 1985; Japan in 1986; Finland in 1986; South Korea in 1987; Sri Lanka in 1987; Austria in 1989; Thailand in 1991; Bahrain in 1992; Singapore in 2002; Australia in 2002 and Canada in 2003.
Wangchuck cultivated bonds of friendship with other countries and strengthened Bhutan-international relationships and diversified its sources of development assistance.

Abdication

Wangchuck said after announcing his decision to abdicate "In taking note of the progress that our nation has made over the past thirty-four years, I would like to state that whatever we have achieved so far is due to the merit of the people of Bhutan."

Wives and children
1. Dorji Wangmo (born 10 June 1955, first wife)

2. Tshering Pem (born 22 December 1957, second wife)

3. Tshering Yangdon (born 21 June 1959, third wife)

4. Sangay Choden (born 11 May 1963, fourth wife)

Styles
11 November 1955 – 15 May 1972: His Royal Highness Dasho (Prince) Jigme Singye Wangchuck
15 May 1972 – 15 July 1972: His Royal Highness Trongsa Penlop Dasho Jigme Singye Wangchuck, The Crown Prince of Bhutan
15 July 1972 – 14 December 2006: His Majesty King Jigme Singye, The Fourth Druk Gyalpo, The King of Bhutan
14 December 2006 – present: His Majesty King Jigme Singye, The Fourth Druk Gyalpo, The King Father of Bhutan

Honours

National honours
  :
  Grand Master of the Royal Order of Bhutan (24 July 1972).
  Grand Master of the Order of Great Victory of the Thunder Dragon (29 September 1985).
  The Royal Saffron Scarf (16 June 1972).
  King Jigme Khesar Investiture Medal (6 November 2008).

Foreign honours
  : 
 Collar of the Supreme Order of the Chrysanthemum (16 March 1987).
  Nepal : 
 Member of the Most Glorious Order of the Benevolent Ruler (5 October 1988).
  : 
  Collar of the Order of Mubarak the Great (1990).
  : 
  Order of Khalifa, 1st Class (1990).
  : 
 Knight of the Royal Order of the Seraphim (1994).

See also
Druk Gyalpo
Ngawang Namgyal
Penlop of Trongsa
Great Buddha Dordenma
House of Wangchuck
Gross National Happiness
Tashichho Dzong
Bhutanese refugees
Ethnic cleansing in Bhutan

References

External references

External links

Ethenic cleansing of Bhutan by King Jigme Singye Wangchuk's Government- Video 1, 2
The Royal Family of Bhutan
Time Magazine's 100 People Who Shape Our World 2006: King Jigme Singye Wangchuck

 

Bhutanese monarchs
Bhutanese expatriates in India
Bhutanese expatriates in the United Kingdom
1955 births
Living people
Tibetan Buddhists from Bhutan
Monarchs who abdicated
Buddhist monarchs
Wangchuck dynasty
Anti-consumerists